The 2013 USA Outdoor Track and Field Championships was held at Drake Stadium in Des Moines, Iowa. Organised by USA Track and Field, the four-day competition took place June 20–23 in conjunction with the USA Junior Outdoor Track & Field Championships which started the day before and served as the national championships in track and field for the United States.

The results of the event determined qualification for the American World Championships team at the 2013 World Championships in Athletics to be held in Moscow, Russia from August 10–18. Provided they had achieved (or will achieve before the cutoff date) the World Championships "A" or "B" standard, the top four athletes can gain a place on the World Championships team in an individual event (although only three can compete). Reigning world champions or Diamond League champions (in events where there is no reigning world champion) received a wild card entry to the World Championships, and they did not count against the maximum number of three athletes per event. Standards set at the 2012 Summer Olympics are only acceptable for the 10,000 metres, racewalk and combined events.

Men's results
Key:
.

Men track events

Men field events

Notes
 Tyson Gay ran 9.75 in the 100 m final and 19.74 in the 200 m final, finishing first in both events, but his performances were annulled after the race for doping.
 Fourth place Ben True has achieved an "A" standard at the Prefontaine Classic
 Defending world champion Jason Richardson is automatically qualified for the World Championships, displacing Diamond League winner Aries Merritt from automatic qualifying, however Merritt qualified by finishing third.
 Trevor Barron has an "A" standard of 1:22:46 from the 2012 Summer Olympics, while Seaman has a "B" standard from a previous competition. 
 Defending world champion Jesse Williams is automatically qualified for the World Championships. As Blair won a administrative jump-off, he will have an opportunity to pursue a standard for the World Championships. 
 Defending world champion Dwight Phillips is automatically qualified for the World Championships.
 Olympic and defending world champion Christian Taylor is automatically qualified for the World Championships. 
 IAAF Diamond League champion Reese Hoffa is automatically qualified for the World Championships, although he choose to compete. Fourth place finisher Cory Martin also makes the team.
 Defending world champion Trey Hardee is automatically qualified for the World Championships. Taiwo has achieved an "A" standard of 8239 from the 2013 NCAA championships.

Women's results
Key:
.

Women track events

Women field events

Notes
 Defending world champion Carmelita Jeter is automatically qualified for the World Championships.
 IAAF Diamond League champion Charonda Williams is automatically qualified for the World Championships.
 Defending world champion Jennifer Simpson is automatically qualified for the World Championships. Moser, Cain and sixth place finisher Sarah Brown have "A" standards from previous competitions. McGee achieved a "B" standard on July 13.
 Fourth place finisher Amy Hastings (32:31.28) and ninth place finisher Lisa Uhl (33:35.80) has an "A" standard from the London Olympics.
 IAAF Diamond League champion Dawn Harper is automatically qualified for the World Championships.
 Defending world champion Lashinda Demus is automatically qualified for the World Championships.
 IAAF Diamond League champion Chaunté Lowe is automatically qualified for the World Championships.
 Olympic and defending world champion Brittney Reese is automatically qualified for the World Championships.
 Lewis-Smallwood, Podominick and sixth place Aretha Thurmond have "A" qualifiers, Ashley has a "B"

References

Results
 Results at USATF

Daily reports
 Rupp, Flanagan win 10,000m finals at USA Outdoor Track & Field Championships. USA Track & Field. Retrieved on 2013-06-20.
 Gay’s 9.75 leads Quartet of World Leading Marks at USA Outdoor Championships. USA Track & Field. Retrieved on 2013-06-21.
 Four American Records on Magnificent Saturday at Outdoor Championships. USA Track & Field. Retrieved on 2013-06-22.
 Upsets and Breakthroughs on Final Day of USA Outdoor Championships. USA Track & Field. Retrieved on 2013-06-23.

USA Outdoor Track and Field Championships
USA Outdoors
Track, Outdoor
2013 in sports in Iowa
Track and field in Iowa